Allan Neil McMillan (born 1951) is a Canadian politician who was the MLA for Kindersley from 1975 to 1978.

References 

Living people
1951 births
20th-century Canadian politicians
People from Kindersley
Saskatchewan Liberal Party MLAs